William Vasiliades (born ) is a Cypriot male weightlifter, competing in the 77 kg category and representing Cyprus at international competitions. He participated at the 2010 Commonwealth Games in the 77 kg event..

Major competitions

References

1987 births
Living people
Cypriot male weightlifters
Weightlifters at the 2010 Commonwealth Games
Commonwealth Games competitors for Cyprus
Place of birth missing (living people)